Roy Goodman (born 1951) is a British conductor and violinist.

Roy Goodman may also refer to:
 
Roy Goodman (racing driver) (born 1929), British racing driver
Roy M. Goodman (1930–2014), New York politician